is a Japanese novelist.

Hirano was born in Gamagori, Aichi prefecture, Japan. He published his first novel (Nisshoku) in 1998 and won the Akutagawa Prize the next year as one of the youngest winners ever (at 23 years of age). He graduated from the Law Department of Kyoto University in 1999. In 2005 he was nominated as a cultural ambassador and spent a year in France.

Novels 
 
 
 The Only Form of Love 2008
 Dawn 2009
 A Man 2018 
Other Works, Essays, Dialogues, etc.

His short story "Clear Water" (Shimizu), translated by Anthony Chambers, appears in Modern Japanese Literature, Volume 2 (Columbia University Press, 2007), pp. 542–549.

Awards 
120th (1998) Akutagawa Prize
18th (2000) Kyoto Culture Prize
59th (2008) Education, Science and Technology Minister’s Art Encouragement Prize for New Writers, for Dam Break
19th (2009) Prix Deux Magots Bunkamura, for Dawn

External links
 Official Website
 L'Eclipse on Amazon.com
Prix Deux Magots Bunkamura
Prix des Deux Magots

Others 

20th-century Japanese novelists
21st-century Japanese novelists
Writers from Aichi Prefecture
Kyoto University alumni
People from Gamagōri
1975 births
Living people
Akutagawa Prize winners